Sheffield Tramway was an extensive tramway network serving the English city of Sheffield and its suburbs.

The first tramway line, horse-drawn, opened in 1873 between Lady's Bridge and Attercliffe, subsequently extended to Brightside and Tinsley. Routes were built to Heeley, where a tram depot was built, Nether Edge and Hillsborough. In 1899, the first electric tram ran between Nether Edge and Tinsley, and by 1902 all the routes were electrified. As of 1910 the network covered 39 miles (62.7 km) and as of 1951 48 miles (77.2 km).

The last trams ran between Leopold Street to Beauchief and Tinsley on 8 October 1960—three Sheffield trams were subsequently preserved at the National Tramway Museum in Crich. 34 years later trams returned to the streets of Sheffield under a new network called Supertram.



History

Horse tram era 

The Sheffield horse tramway was created under the Tramways Act 1870, with powers granted in July 1872. The first routes, to Attercliffe and Carbrook, Brightside, Heeley, Nether Edge and Owlerton opened between 1873 and 1877. Under the legislation at that time, local authorities were precluded from operating tramways but were empowered to construct them and lease the lines to an individual operating company. Tracks were constructed by contractors and leased to the Sheffield Tramways Company, which operated the services.

Prior to the inauguration of the horse trams, horse buses had provided a limited public service, but road surfaces were poor and their carrying capacity was low. The new horse trams gave a smoother ride. The fares were too high for the average worker so the horse trams saw little patronage; services began later than when workers began their day so were of little use to most. Running costs were high as the operator had to keep a large number of horses and could not offer low fares.

Electric tram era 

Sheffield Corporation (Sheffield City Council) took over the tramway system in July 1896. The corporation's goal was to expand and mechanise the system. Almost immediately a committee was formed to inspect other tramway systems to look at the improved systems of traction. Upon their return the committee recommended the adoption of electrical propulsion using the overhead current collection system.

The National Grid was not as developed as it is now and so the Corporation set out to generate the required current - the Corporation became the local domestic and industrial electricity supplier. A power station was built for Sheffield Corporation Tramways on Kelham Island by the river Don between Mowbray Street and Alma Street. Feeder cables stretched from there to the extremities of the system, covering over 40 miles of route.

The horse operated lines were left opened and track replaced with heavier rails. Along with lines opening to Abbeydale, Walkley and Hunter's Bar, the missing link in the centre of the sprawling network between Moorhead and Lady's Bridge was finally laid.

Electric lines opened in succession; Nether Edge to Tinsley on 6 September 1899, to Walkley on 18 September 1899 and Pitsmoor on 27 September 1899. The other electric lines opened soon after allowing the Hillsborough to be closed in November 1902.

The network was basically in place by 1905, further development included extending lines out of the city and connecting lines.

In 1905, Rotherham Corporation connected their line to Templeborough to Tinsley and both Sheffield and Rotherham corporations began running services between both towns. Some tensions existed between both councils and services were halted between September 1914 and May 1915 leaving passengers to either walk between both networks or use the railways. Sheffield Corporation introduced motor bus services from the termini to outlying districts in 1918.

The First World War made material scarce and progress in bus technology which meant that many cities abandoned their tram networks. Sheffield considered trolleybuses, but found no favours in the Council who preferred motor buses. Twenty second-hand double-deck tramcars were purchased from London County Council Tramways in 1917 and 1918, due to the material shortage. This was a rare move but a necessary one to replace single-deck cars. The scarcity of material did not deter the corporation, though, who extended the network to Handsworth, Mansfield Road and to Sheffield Lane Top. In 1927, the Beauchief and Meadowhead lines were joined by the laying of track along Abbey Lane. Prince of Wales Road line was linked to the Handsworth and Intake line. The Nether Edge line was closed in 1934, in face of line renewal costs, the Nether Green via Broomhill line suffering the same fate.

The Prussian blue with cream bands with gold leaf lining livery gave way to the Cream with azure blue bands.

After the Second World War, the railway bridge on Sheffield Road was replaced and the through-tram service to Rotherham temporarily suspended. It was never reinstated. In 1951, the decision was taken to eventually close the tramway system and replace it with motor buses. The decision was not unanimous, Councillor R.W. Allott resigned from the ruling Labour Group in protest. The Council compared the price to replace tramcars with that of buses, ignoring the shorter lifespan of motor buses.

The first line conversion was the Fulwood to Malin Bridge in 1952. Several protests broke out following the publishing of the news. "Sheffield folk were fond of their trams and did not take kindly to the prospect of losing them". An unsuccessful petition was handed over to the council by the Holme Lane residents and traders. The second conversion occurred in 1954 and was the Ecclesall to Middlewood line. Thos. W. Ward received most of the trams for scrapping via a track connection into their scrap-yard on Attercliffe Common, almost opposite the end of Weedon Street.

The last route, Beauchief to Vulcan Road, closed on the afternoon of Saturday 8 October 1960. An illuminated car, followed by a procession of fourteen trams, carried passengers and Council dignitaries from Beauchief to the Tinsley depot. Trams then went on to Tinsley or Queens Road, trams led to the Queens Road were destined for preservation.

Network

The Sheffield Tramway Company's original horse-drawn tram network was 9 miles long and radiated from the city centre to Tinsley, Brightside, Hillsborough, Nether Edge and Heeley. A few years after Sheffield Corporation took over horse tramways were gradually replaced first by single-deck, then double-deck electric trams. It extended routes to Beauchief and Woodseats in 1927 and to Darnall and Intake in 1928.

Adjacent lines were converted into circular route by sleeper-track connecting links. The line along Abbey Lane linking Beauchief to Woodseats was mostly reserved track.

The last extensions were opened in 1934 and extended the network to Lane Top, via Firth Park. Three small sections, Fulwood Road, Nether Edge and Petre St, were closed between 1925 and 1936.

In 1952 the Corporation closed two sections followed by the rest of the network between 1954 and 1960. The sortable table below shows opening and closing dates of routes -

1 via Newhall Road

2 Owlerton via Penistone Road opened 12 February 1902

3 via the Moor; Shoreham Street and Queens Road opened 1904

4 via Shoreham Street and Queens Road

5 via the Moor

Tram depots
Eight depots were built throughout the city to service a fleet of about 400 trams.

Tinsley depot

Tinsley depot was built in 1874 and was the first depot built for the "Sheffield Tramways Company". It was originally built for horse trams but was converted for electric trams in 1898–99, after which it was capable of accommodating 95 trams. Following the abandonment of the tramway system in 1960, it was sold and was subsequently used as a warehouse. Much of the original 1874 building still exists and the entire depot is listed as a historically significant building.  The Sheffield Bus Museum Trust used part of the depot as the Sheffield Bus Museum from 1987 until 2007, when it moved to a factory unit at Aldwarke, Rotherham. Since then the Sheffield Bus Museum Trust has been renamed the South Yorkshire Transport Museum.

The building was then all but empty, with just a tile dealer left, in the first two bays through the gate.

In 2009, the building was once again fully occupied. The rest of the bays are now home to the South Yorkshire Transport Trust's 75 vehicle collection - http://www.sytt.webeden.co.uk/
The SYTT announced plans in February 2010 that looks set to see Tinsley Depot restored and opened as a new Museum.

Heeley depot

Heeley depot was for horse trams only: the line to it was never electrified. 
The depot was built by the Sheffield Tramways company in 1878. 
When the building was no longer required it was sold off and used as a motor vehicle repair shop until 2005, when it was purchased to become part of a block of flats. 
The building, had 'Listed Status', as part of which, the builder was told the archway, which included the carved stone "Sheffield Tramways" legend had to remain in place. Although promises were made by the builder to that effect, locals woke one morning to find it knocked down.

The builder told the council that it was unsafe and fell down in the night.
Sheffield City Council instructed the builder that all work on site must stop until the archway was restored, however work continued regardless.

Flats were built in place of the depot and the central rooftop removed to make way for a courtyard. The original archway was finally rebuilt, partly with original material but noticeably different and with a lot of new material. Slate from the original roof was replaced. 
The arch looks 'new' and some locals have said it has lost its originality. It is far higher that it was before as it has been lifted to comply with regulations to allow access by the fire service.

Nether Edge depot
A small tram shed was built at the Nether Edge terminus, opened in 1899. The Nether Edge line and two other small sections were abandoned due to the narrowness of the streets, which caused problems and were unsuitable for efficient service.

Queens Road works
Queens Road works opened in 1905. Many of Sheffield trams were built here. The building survived for many years following abandonment, but was demolished in 1993.

Shoreham Street depot
Construction of Shoreham Street depot started in about 1910 on the site of an 18th-century lead mill. Following the abandonment of the tramway the depot was used as a bus garage until the 1990s. Much of the building has since been demolished and redeveloped as student flats. Those parts that surround the entrance at the junction of Shoreham Street and Leadmill Road are still standing and in good condition, though a new use for them has yet to be found.

Crookes depot
Crookes depot, which was on Pickmere Road, was started in 1914 but not completed until 1919. It closed on 5 May 1957 and has since been demolished and a church now stands on the site.

Tenter Street depot
Tenter Street depot opened in 1928 and was the last operational tram depot. There was a bus garage on the upper level, accessed from Hawley Street.

Holme Lane depot (Hillsborough)
The depot at Holme Lane closed on 23 April 1954. The facade of the building still stands, although the rest of the building has been demolished and a medical centre built in its place.

Rolling stock
For a comprehensive list of Sheffield trams of the tramway see Tramcars of the Sheffield Tramway.

Unlike other tram companies, whose trams were often rebuilt and made to last 30 to 40 years, Sheffield Corporation adopted a policy of replacement by new vehicles after a 25-year life. By 1940, only 11 of its 444 trams were older than 26 years, more than half of them were less than ten.

Sheffield Corporation operated 884 trams. Its last livery was blue and cream, worn on the preserved trams at Crich and Beamish.

The 'Preston' cars

The United Electric Car Company of Preston built 15 double deck balcony cars for Sheffield Corporation Tramways in 1907. Initially numbered 258–272 they had wooden seats for 59 passengers, and were mounted on a four-wheel Peckham P22 truck with two Metrovick 102DR 60 hp motors operated by British Thomson-Houston B510 controllers. The braking systems consisted of a handbrake acting on all wheels, an electric brake for emergency use and a hand-wheel operated track brake. Between December 1924 and July 1927 they were rebuilt with a totally enclosed upper deck.

The 'Rocker Panel' cars
Following the production of a prototype at Queens Road works in 1918, between 1919 and 1927 Brush at Loughborough built 100 of these cars, and another 50 at Cravens in Darnall.

The 'Standard' cars
The prototype Standard car (number 1) was built by Cravens at Darnall, and entered service in 1927. Subsequently, about 150 were built at Queens Road works and 25 by W.E. Hill & Sons in South Shields. From 1936 to 1939 Queens Road works built redesigned Standard cars, known as the 'Domed-roof' class, which had improved lighting and seats.

The 'Roberts' cars
The prototype for this series, number 501, was built at Queens Road works in August 1946. With comfortable upholstered seating for 62 passengers, it was the last car to be built at the works. From 1950 to 1952 35 more, numbered 502–536, were constructed by Charles Roberts & Co. of Horbury near Wakefield. They were carried on a four-wheel Maley & Taunton hornless type 588 truck with rubber and leaf spring suspension, powered by two Metrovick 101 DR3 65 hp motors. Air brakes were fitted, acting on all wheels, and electric braking was available for emergency use. Car 536, which entered service on 11 April 1952, was the last tram to be constructed for Sheffield. Representing the ultimate development of the traditional British four-wheel tram, the class worked for only 10 years, as Sheffield tramway closed in 1960. On 8 October of that year, car 513, ran specially decorated in the final procession; so too did sister tram 510, now preserved by the National Tramway Museum at Crich.

Sheffield trams in preservation

The National Tramway Museum, Crich
The National Tramway Museum at Crich in Derbyshire holds eight Sheffield trams. Sheffield Corporation Tramways car 15 is a horse tram dating from 1874; it was the first tram to be used at the museum in 1963 and still remains serviceable. Car 74 is another Victorian Sheffield tram, sold to the Gateshead tramway and ran until 1951. Although only its lower deck survived, as a garden shed, it has been restored to original condition by the museum and is operational. The museum also has Standard car 189 (on display), Domed-roof car 264 (on display), and Roberts car 510 (operational). In addition there is also Sheffield works car 330 and early single-deck tram 46 that are not in working condition.

North of England Open Air Museum, Beamish
The North of England Open Air Museum at Beamish had two preserved Sheffield trams. Number 264 is a Preston car dating from 1907 and is in service after a major overhaul was completed in 2016, Number 513, a Roberts car dating from 1950, was there also until a few years ago.
It first travelled to Blackpool, then Beamish and finally on to the East Anglian Transport Museum near Lowestoft, where it currently resides.

513 was stored for some time on disused railway sidings and lost its control equipment and most of its glass due to vandalism. It was fitted with replacement controllers from a different vehicle, and is therefore no longer the same as when it was built.

South Yorkshire Transport Museum
The SYTM owns Sheffield Corporation tramcar 460. The tramcar was built by Cravens in Darnall, Sheffield and was part of a batch of fifty cars, all numbered between 451 and 500. The car was equipped with upholstered seats in April 1939 and survived the Blitz on Sheffield in December 1940. She was withdrawn in February 1950 and stored at Tinsley Tram Sheds until 1951 when the car was dismantled with the lower and upper saloon bodies being disposed of separately. The lower saloon of No 460 fetched £25 and was used on a farm in Lincolnshire.

The lower body was generously donated by Mr and Mrs K.S. Jacklin of Susworth near Scunthorpe and returned to Tinsley in May 1987.

Remnants

There are very few remnants of the once extensive tramway.

The tram shed at Tinsley survives more or less intact, as do parts of those at Holme Lane and Shoreham Street. Parts of Heeley shed remain but it has been stripped out and substantially altered, turning it in to an approximation of its former self.

In many places the tram tracks were not removed: the road was resurfaced over the tracks, which survive (albeit covered). An example of tracks covered in this way was uncovered and made a feature of The Moor pedestrian precinct for a time, but this was re-covered when the area was re-modelled a few years back.

At Firth Park, the short section of reserved track, running through the middle of a roundabout, still exists.

There were about ten traction poles still standing in 2006, such as the matching pair in Firth Park, and single poles at Manor Top, Woodseats, Abbeydale Road, Angel Street and also the last pole outside Tinsley Depot.

On the pavement of Howard Road in Walkley, near the junction with Commonside, several manhole covers marked "Sheffield Corporation Tramway" are still in place. A manhole survives on Abbeydale Road between the junction with Sheldon Road and Abbeydale Picture House with the inscription "Sheffield Corporation Electric Tramways".

In places where the trams ran on a reserved track, such as on Abbeydale Road South and Abbey Lane at Beauchief, the reservation has been converted into a dual carriageway. The former line lives on in the name of Terminus Road, Abbeydale.

At Kelham Island, the power station that generated the electricity for system still stands and is now the Kelham Island Museum.

Resurfacing projects across the city in 2019 have uncovered a large amount of old tram rails, which have since been removed.

References

External links

 Sheffield Bus Museum
 Sheffield tram in the 1960s
 1902 Mitchell & Kenyon film of a tramride through Sheffield (on BFI website)

Tramway
Tram transport in Sheffield
Sheffield
Tram transport in England